Conchita Martínez Bernat (born 16 April 1972) is a Spanish former professional tennis player. She was the first Spaniard to win the women's singles title at Wimbledon, doing so in 1994. Martínez also was the runner-up at the 1998 Australian Open and the 2000 French Open. She reached a career-high ranking of world No. 2 in October 1995, and was in the year-end Top 10 for nine years. Martínez won 33 singles and 13 doubles titles during her 18-year career, as well as three Olympic medals. She was inducted into the International Tennis Hall of Fame in 2020.

A five-time winner of the Fed Cup as a player, Martínez was the Spanish Fed Cup team captain from 2013 to 2017 and the Spanish Davis Cup team captain from 2015 to 2017, leading the Davis Cup team back into the top-tier World Group under her captaincy. She has also served as a part-time coach to Garbiñe Muguruza, guiding her to the 2017 Wimbledon Championships title, and was the full-time coach to Karolína Plíšková through 2018 and 2019. She began coaching Muguruza on a full-time basis in November 2019. Martínez won the 2021 WTA Coach of the Year award for her work coaching Muguruza.

Career

1988–1992: Breakthrough, Top 10, Grand Slam quarterfinals
Born in Monzón, Martínez turned professional in 1988.  At the age of just 16, she reached the fourth round at the French Open in her third professional tournament.  She upset ninth-seed Lori McNeil en route before losing to Bettina Fulco in two sets. In 1989, her breakthrough year, Martínez got rid of Sabatini to win the title at Tampa and also won two Tier V tournaments (Wellington, Phoenix).  She also reached the quarterfinals of the French Open, losing to Steffi Graf.  She finished the year World No. 7.  In 1990 and 1991, Martínez won a further six titles and again reached the quarterfinals at the French Open both years (losing to Graf in 1990 and Monica Seles in 1991).

The following year, Martínez was a silver medalist in doubles at the Olympic Games in Barcelona (partnering Arantxa Sánchez Vicario) and the runner-up in women's doubles at the French Open. Once again, Martínez was a quarterfinalist at the French Open, losing a tight match with Sabatini. In 1992 she was runner up in Indian Wells and San Diego.

1993–1996: Highest ranking, Wimbledon singles title
In 1993, Martínez became the first Spanish woman since Lilí de Álvarez in 1928 to reach the semifinals at Wimbledon, where she lost to Steffi Graf in two sets. In November Martínez defeated Graf for the first and only time in her career, at a tournament in Philadelphia in the final. At the Italian Open, Martínez defeated Sabatini in the final in straight sets to become the first Spaniard to win the tournament since de Álvarez in 1930. She again reached the quarterfinals at the French Open for the fifth year in a row, losing a 2-hour, 45-minute three-set battle with Anke Huber.

Martínez reached the Wimbledon singles final in 1994 beating Rene Simpson, Nana Smith, Nathalie Tauziat, Kristine Kunce and Lindsay Davenport in the quarterfinal and Lori McNeil in the semifinals where the third set went to 10–8, where she faced nine-time Wimbledon champion Martina Navratilova. Navratilova's last Wimbledon triumph had come four years earlier, but many observers felt that the 37-year-old Czech-born American was the favourite going into the match given her long track record of success on grass courts, whereas Martínez's most significant tournament victories up to that time had been on slower-playing surfaces, particularly on clay courts. Martínez, however, won the match in three sets and became the first Spanish woman to win Wimbledon. In 1995, Martínez was a semifinalist at all four Grand Slam tournaments and reached her career-high singles ranking of World No. 2. In the Australian Open she beat Lindsay Davenport in the quarterfinals before losing to Mary Pierce in the semifinals. At Wimbledon, Martínez beat Sabatini in the quarterfinals before losing to Arantxa Sánchez Vicario in the semifinals. She also had a new coach that year, Carlos Kirmayr.

In 1996, Martínez became the only player to win the Italian Open singles title four consecutive years after a straight-sets victory in the final against 15-year-old Martina Hingis. She also partnered Sánchez Vicario to claim a women's doubles Olympic bronze medal in Atlanta.

1997–2006: Out of top 10 and return, Australian and French Open runner-up
In 1998, Martínez reached her second career Grand Slam singles final at the Australian Open. She beat Lindsay Davenport in the semifinals before losing to Martina Hingis in the final in straight sets. At the German Open in May she defeated Amélie Mauresmo to win her first singles title in 18 months. She also helped Spain win the Fed Cup that year, beating Patty Schnyder of Switzerland 6–3, 2–6, 9–7 in 3 hours, 19 minutes in the final.

In January 2000 at the Australian Open Martínez beat Elena Likhovtseva in the quarterfinals after Likhovtseva twice failed to serve for the match to reach the semifinals where she was beaten by Martina Hingis. Martínez reached the final of the French Open in 2000, where she lost to Mary Pierce in two sets after beating Sánchez Vicario in the semifinals. She also won the German Open, beating Hingis in a semifinal and Amanda Coetzer in the final. In 2001, Martínez was a runner-up in the women's doubles at the French Open (partnering Jelena Dokic). Martínez also reached the quarterfinals at Wimbledon for the first time in six years but lost to Justine Henin of Belgium. In 2003 Martínez reached her last grand slam quarterfinal in the French Open losing to Kim Clijsters. Also that year she reached the final at Eastbourne losing to Chanda Rubin.

Martínez won her second Olympic silver medal in the women's doubles in 2004 in Athens, Greece (partnering Virginia Ruano Pascual). In 2005, Martínez won her first singles title in five years at Pattaya, Thailand. It was her last singles title, bringing her career total to 33 top-level singles titles, 9 of which were Tier I events, and 13 doubles titles. On 15 April 2006, aged 33 and after 18 years of playing professionally, she announced her retirement, having won more professional singles tournaments than any other Spanish female tennis player.

In 2008, 2009 and 2010 Martínez played at Wimbledon in the Ladies Invitations Doubles. In 2010 her partner in doubles was Nathalie Tauziat.

During Australian Open 2020, it was announced that she and Goran Ivanišević will be inducted into Tennis Hall of Fame as Class of 2020.

Playing style
Nicknamed Senorita Topspin, Martínez was a patient, right-handed baseline player who won matches by disrupting her opponents' rhythm through changes of spin, pace, depth, height, and angle. She had a strong backhand, played single-handedly, and used heavy topspin on her forehand and slower topspin and slice on her backhand. A characteristic shot of Martínez was to hit a deep, looping forehand with a lot of topspin with the intent to drive her opponent to the back of the court and make her hit the ball at shoulder height.
She often sought out the ball with which she had won the previous point. This sometimes irritated her opponents; Patty Schnyder once pocketed the ball to prevent Martínez from retrieving it, and rejected the traditional handshake at the end of the match.

Performance timelines

Singles

Doubles

See also
 Performance timelines for all female tennis players who reached at least one Grand Slam final

References

External links

 
 
 
 

1972 births
Hopman Cup competitors
Living people
Olympic bronze medalists for Spain
Olympic silver medalists for Spain
Olympic medalists in tennis
Olympic tennis players of Spain
People from Cinca Medio
Sportspeople from the Province of Huesca
Spanish female tennis players
Tennis players at the 1992 Summer Olympics
Tennis players at the 1996 Summer Olympics
Tennis players at the 2000 Summer Olympics
Tennis players at the 2004 Summer Olympics
Wimbledon champions
Grand Slam (tennis) champions in women's singles
Medalists at the 2004 Summer Olympics
Tennis players from San Diego
Medalists at the 1996 Summer Olympics
Medalists at the 1992 Summer Olympics
Lesbian sportswomen
Spanish LGBT sportspeople
LGBT tennis players
Mediterranean Games gold medalists for Spain
Competitors at the 1987 Mediterranean Games
Spanish tennis coaches
Mediterranean Games medalists in tennis
21st-century LGBT people